The Belarusian Left Party "A Just World" is a left-wing political party in Belarus that opposes the government of president Alexander Lukashenko.

History
Founded as the Belarusian Party of Communists (PСB) in 1991 as the legal successor to the ruling Communist Party of Byelorussia, the organization originally emerged as one of the major political parties in independent Belarus. With Lukashenko having become president in 1994, a split in sentiment occurred within the PBC and in 1996, a pro-Lukashenko faction of the party broke away and formed the Communist Party of Belarus.

In the 13–17 October 2004 legislative elections, the party was part of the People's Coalition 5 Plus, which did not secure any seats. These elections fell significantly short of Organization for Security and Co-operation in Europe (OSCE) standards according to OSCE's Election Observation Mission. Universal principles and constitutionally guaranteed rights of expression, association and assembly were seriously challenged, calling into question the Belarusian authorities' willingness to respect the concept of political competition on a basis of equal treatment. According to this mission, principles of an inclusive democratic process, whereby citizens have the right to seek political office without discrimination, candidates to present their views without obstruction, and voters to learn about them and discuss them freely, were largely ignored.

The party was banned for six months for paperwork irregularities on 2 August 2007.

The party is led by Sergey Kalyakin. In February 2007, Kalyakin visited the United States and met both chambers of the US Congress, Department of State officials, and representatives of non-governmental organizations in order to discuss ways in which the US could influence processes that were taking place in Belarus. In addition, Kalyakin suggested that the US, the European Union and Russia cooperate to develop a common policy regarding Belarus.

As of October 2009, the party is a member of the Party of the European Left.

In November 2009, the party was renamed to the Belarusian United Left Party "A Just World."

Electoral history

Presidential elections

Legislative elections

References

External links
 
Official website of the party newspaper

1991 establishments in Belarus
Communist parties in Belarus
Party of the European Left member parties
Political parties established in 1991
Political parties in Belarus
Formerly banned communist parties